Judge Sloan may refer to:

Richard Elihu Sloan (1857–1933), judge of the United States District Court for the District of Arizona
William Boyd Sloan (1895–1970), judge of the United States District Court for the Northern District of Georgia

See also
Justice Sloan (disambiguation)